This is the list of notable footballers  who have played for Burgos CF since its re-foundation in 1994. Generally, this means players that have played 100 or more league matches for the club. However, some players who have played fewer matches are also included; this includes international players at the club and some players who fell short of the 100 total but made significant contributions to the club's history or in his career.

Appearances and goals include Segunda División, Segunda División B and Tercera División games without playoffs since 1997. Substitute appearances are included.

Statistics are correct as of the end of the 2016–17 season.

Key

Players

References
List of players in BDFutbol.com
Statistics at AupaBurgos.com

Burgos

Association football player non-biographical articles
Players